Miconia holosericea is a species of shrub or tree in the family Melastomataceae. It is native to North and South America.

References

holosericea
Trees of Peru